Hwaseong Sports Town is a group of sports facilities in Hwaseong, Gyeonggi, South Korea. The complex consists of the Hwaseong Stadium and Hwaseong Indoor Arena.

Facilities

Hwaseong Stadium 
The Hwaseong Stadium is a multi-use stadium, completed in 2011. It is used mostly for football matches. The stadium has a capacity for 35,265 spectators.

The stadium cost $175 million to build and is the home ground of Hwaseong FC, a semi-professional team competing in the K3 League (third division).

The stadium has hosted South Korea World Cup qualifiers, including a 2018 FIFA World Cup qualifier against Laos and a 2022 FIFA World Cup qualifier against Sri Lanka. The stadium has also hosted football matches at the 2013 EAFF East Asian Cup and the 2014 Asian Games.

Hwaseong Indoor Arena 
The Hwaseong Indoor Arena is the home gymnasium of the women's professional volleyball team Hwaseong IBK Altos, competing in the V-League.

References

Multi-purpose stadiums in South Korea
Football venues in South Korea
Sports venues in Gyeonggi Province
Venues of the 2014 Asian Games
Sports venues completed in 2011
2011 establishments in South Korea